Bridgeport Municipal Airport  is a public airport near Bridgeport, in Wise County, Texas.

Most U.S. airports use the same three-letter location identifier for the FAA and IATA, but Bridgeport Municipal Airport is XBP (formerly 1F9) to the FAA and has no IATA code.

Facilities and aircraft 

In the year ending June 23, 2005, the airport had 12,300 aircraft operations, all general aviation. 49 aircraft are based at the airport: 70% single engine, 14% multi-engine, 12% ultralight and 4% helicopters.

Accidents and incidents 
16 July 2001: In a rare case of airplane theft, two men stole a Piper PA-28-180 from Parker County Airport near Weatherford, Texas, but crashed while attempting to land at Bridgeport Municipal Airport a short time later. Hudson Oaks police speculated that the men intended to refuel the aircraft in Bridgeport before flying it to Oklahoma. Neither of the thieves had ever held a pilot certificate, but the man who acted as pilot reportedly had 6 hours of prior flight time. The aircraft impacted the runway in a nose-down attitude and slid for a considerable distance; both men suffered serious injuries. No verifiable problems were found in the engine, airframe, or flight controls. The accident was attributed to "the non-certificated pilot's improper flare which resulted in a hard landing."

References 
Notes

Citations

External links 

Airports in Texas
Buildings and structures in Wise County, Texas
Transportation in Wise County, Texas